Shutts & Bowen LLP is an AmLaw 200 law firm with 270 attorneys in seven offices in the State of Florida.  Shutts & Bowen was founded in 1910. Frank B. Shutts came to Miami in 1909 and became the legal representative of Henry M. Flagler and the  Florida East Coast Railway Company. In 1910 he formed a professional association with Henry F. Atkinson. In 1912 Crate D. Bowen joined the firm which settled on the name Shutts and Bowen in 1919. In 1910 Shutts organized the  Miami Herald Publishing Company and was its President and principal stockholder. Shutts and Bowen is ranked as the 175th largest law firm in the United States.  Its offices are located in the Florida cities of Miami, Fort Lauderdale, West Palm Beach, Orlando, Tampa, Sarasota and Tallahassee. According to statistics submitted to American Lawyer, Shutts & Bowen recorded $147 million in revenue for the year 2015, up 7.7% from 2014, with profits per partner averaging $740,000 in 2015, up 5.7% from $700,000 in 2014.

In February 2020, Shutts & Bowen announced the addition of James Eaglesham as the new Chief Financial Officer. He was most recently Firm Controller at Greenberg Traurig, LLP and was a Finance and Corporate Audit Senior Manager for Ryder System, Inc.

Other Attorneys 
United States Supreme Court Justice Sherman Minton worked at Shutts and Bowen before he began his political and judicial career.

Congressman Robert Wexler, was a former partner in the West Palm Beach Office of Shutts & Bowen before he became a State Senator and then a member of the U.S. House of Representatives in the 1996 election.

Jonathan Gerber, a former partner in the West Palm Beach Office, became a Palm Beach County Court Judge from 2002 to 2004, then a Circuit Court Judge from 2004 until 2009, and on April 7, 2009, Florida Governor Charlie Christ appointed him to the Florida Fourth District Court of Appeal.

See also
Akerman LLP
Greenberg Traurig

References

Bibliography
 Blackman, E. V. Miami and Dade County, Florida. Washington, DC: Victor Rainbolt, 1921.

Law firms based in Miami
Law firms established in 1910